All is an unincorporated community in Webster County, in the U.S. state of Missouri.

History
A post office called All was established in 1899, and remained in operation until 1905. According to tradition, the community's name derived from the fact "it's a post office, that's all".

References

Unincorporated communities in Webster County, Missouri
Unincorporated communities in Missouri